David Hardie may refer to:
 David Hardie (physician) (1856–1945), Australian medical practitioner
 David Hardie (politician) (1870s–1939), British politician

See also
 David Hardy (disambiguation)